The Faidherbe was an express train that linked Gare du Nord in Paris, France, with Lille in the North of France. The train was named after the Lille born governor of Senegal, General Louis Faidherbe. 

One year before the creating of the TEE-network the French railway SNCF introduced three Trains d'affaires to link Paris with the industrial area in the North near the Belgian border. This trains were scheduled with a morning, midday and evening service in both directions. Initially the service was operated with RGP 600 DMUs. In 1959 these were replaced by locomotive hauled trains consisting of Corail coaches. Although domestic TEE-services were allowed from 1965 the Trains d'affaires were not upgraded until 1978. Together with the upgrading to TEE the trains were named. The morning service pair was named Faidherbe, departing 7:01 from Lille and 7:30 from Paris.

References

Works cited

EuroCity
International named passenger trains
Named passenger trains of France
Trans Europ Express
Railway services introduced in 1978